Cyathostemon heterantherus is a member of the family Myrtaceae endemic to Western Australia.

It is found in a large area in the Wheatbelt region of Western Australia.

References

heterantherus
Plants described in 2012